Brasfemes is a civil parish in the municipality of Coimbra, Portugal. The population in 2021 was 1,935, in an area of 9.18 km2.

References 

Freguesias of Coimbra